HD 123657, or BY Boötis, is a variable star of magnitude 4.98–5.33V. This makes it a dim naked eye star.  The star is located near the end of the handle of the Big Dipper, but just within the boundaries of the constellation Boötes.

It is a slow irregular red giant variable star with a range of less than half a magnitude.  It is over a thousand times as luminous as the sun, only 3,500 K but with a large expanded atmosphere.

References 

Boötes
123657
069038
M-type giants
5299
Boötis, BY
Slow irregular variables
Durchmusterung objects